The Harman geared locomotive was a geared steam locomotive by Alfred Harman from Melbourne in Australia.

History 

The Forests Commission Victoria (FCV) called a tender for a new geared steam locomotive up to 27 May 1927. The Melbourne-based company of Alfred Harman issued an offer, which the FCV was obliged to accept against its better judgement, as the only suitable alternatives were made in the USA. At that time, government policy favoured the purchase of locally made machines or if these were not available, machines made in the United Kingdom.

The design concept was based on the use of Harman's successful logging winches in the power bogies, but the large number of unproven design features resulted in several faults. Thus this engine had to be replaced in April 1928 by a ‘Class B’ Climax locomotive by the Climax Manufacturing Co., USA.

The locomotive was delivered at Moe by the Victorian Railways on 29 November 1927. It was off-loaded onto the Walhalla branch line. The following day it travelled under steam to Collins siding, in charge of a Victorian Railways crew. On arrival, it steamed over a temporary connection with the tramway and commenced the run to Tyers Junction.

During the problematic delivery run to Tyers Junction the engine derailed twice at 1m64c on an S-curve. The locomotive was rerailed and returned to Collins Siding, where weaker springs were installed to reduce the rigidity of the bogies. On 13 December 1927, the trip to Tyers Junction was made smoother by the use of grease on the outer rail at curves. Timber haulage commenced on 12 January 1928, after conducting modifications to the bogie masts.

References 

Geared steam locomotives